Cynthia Mary Illingworth (née Redhead) FRCP FRCPCH (Hon) (3 August 1920 – 30 August 1999) was an English consultant paediatrician and medical author. She was the first consultant in paediatric accident and emergency medicine in the United Kingdom.

Biography 
Cynthia Mary Redhead was born in Newcastle upon Tyne on 3 August 1920. Her father, Arthur Blenkinsop Redhead, was an electrical engineer. She was educated at Dame Allan's School and went on to study medicine at Durham University. She medical training was taken at the Royal Victoria Infirmary, Newcastle, working with the paediatrician Sir James Spence.

In 1947, she took up a position as a lecturer in child health at the University of Sheffield. She was a physician in the paediatric accident and emergency department at Sheffield Children's Hospital. In 1972 she was became the first consultant in paediatric accident and emergency medicine in the UK.

In 1947 she married Ronald Illingworth and together they had two daughters and a son. Their children all became physicians. She had six grandchildren.

She enjoyed travel, painting, the theatre, and music.

Illingworth died suddenly on 30 August 1999 of carcinomatosis.

Selected bibliography 
Illingworth authored and co-authored more than ten medical text books and several journal articles including:

 Babies and young children : feeding, management and care, by Ronald S Illingworth and Cynthia Illingworth. Churchill Livingstone., 7th ed 1984.
 Lessons from childhood: some aspects of the early life of unusual men and women, by Ronald S Illingworth; Cynthia M Illingworth. E.& S. Livingstone, 1969.
 The diagnosis and primary care of accidents and emergencies in children : a manual for the casualty officer and the family doctor by Cynthia M Illingworth. Blackwell Scientific Publications, 1978
 Babies and young children: a guide for parents by Ronald S Illingworth and Cynthia Illingworth. Churchill Livingstone, 1960
 Babies and young children: feeding, management and care by Ronald S Illingworth and Cynthia Illingworth. Churchill Livingstone. 1954
 227 road accidents to children by Cynthia Illingworth. Acta Pædiatrica, v68 n6 (December 1979): 869-873
 225 skateboard injuries in children by Cynthia M. Illingworth; Ann Jay; Dilys Noble; Mary Collick. Clinical Pediatrics, v17 n10 (10/1978): 781-782

References 

1920 births
1999 deaths
People from Newcastle upon Tyne
English women medical doctors
British paediatricians
Fellows of the Royal College of Paediatrics and Child Health
Fellows of the Royal College of Physicians
Women pediatricians
Alumni of Durham University